Kenneth Ray Harvey (born May 6, 1965) is a former professional American football player in the National Football League (NFL).  He currently works as a fitness trainer for space tourists and a sports writer for The Washington Post.

Football career
Harvey played professional football in the National Football League as an outside linebacker for the Phoenix Cardinals and the Washington Redskins from 1988 to 1998.  He played collegiately at the University of California, Berkeley and was selected by the Cardinals in the first round (12th overall) in the 1988 NFL Draft.  Harvey was a four-time Pro Bowl selection from 1994 to 1997.  In his career, he appeared in 164 games and recorded 89 sacks.

Sports writer
Harvey began providing video commentary for the website of The Washington Post.  His video column is titled Word on the Street with Ken Harvey.  The formula for his videos is to interview Washington Redskins fans after each game.  In addition to his videos he contributes to the online text column titled At The Game.

Harvey also began writing a weekly sports column about the Redskins in October 2011 for the Joint Base Journal, a publication produced by the Joint Base Anacostia-Bolling Public Affairs office.

Children's book author
Harvey has written several children's books, among them The Leftover Games, When Chocolate Milk Moved In, and The Fridge Games. He also wrote a book in 2019 called Come Find Me, that was illustrated by actor, and former teammate, Terry Crews.

Of interest
Former president of the Washington Redskins Alumni Association.

References

External links

1965 births
Living people
Players of American football from Austin, Texas
American football linebackers
California Golden Bears football players
Phoenix Cardinals players
Washington Redskins players
National Conference Pro Bowl players
Ed Block Courage Award recipients